Burkle, Bürkle or Buerkle (English: /ˈbɜːrkəl/ BUR-kəl)  may refer to
Burkle addressing system of assigning road names and addresses over a large, rural area
Burkle Estate in Memphis, U.S.
Winifred Burkle, fictional character on the American TV series Angel
Burkle (surname)

See also
Burkel